The United States competed at the 1960 Summer Paralympics in Rome, Italy.

Medalists

See also 

 United States at the 1960 Summer Olympics

References

Nations at the 1960 Summer Paralympics
1960
Paralympics